United States gubernatorial elections were held November 3, 1964, concurrently with the presidential election. Elections were held in 25 states and 1 territory. This was the last gubernatorial elections for Florida, Massachusetts, Michigan, and Nebraska to take place in a presidential election year. Florida switched its governor election years to midterm years, while the other three expanded their terms from two to four years, this election also coincided with the Senate and the House elections.

Chart

See also
1964 United States elections
1964 United States presidential election
1964 United States Senate elections
1964 United States House of Representatives elections

References

 
November 1964 events in the United States